Fight Club is a fighting video game based on the 1999 film of the same name, which was based on the 1996 novel by Chuck Palahniuk. It was developed by Genuine Games and published by Vivendi Universal Games, and was released for the PlayStation 2 and Xbox systems in 2004.

Gameplay
The game contains a wide combination of gameplay and visual elements found in several notable sixth-generation 3D fighting games, such as multi height-zone targeting combos consisting of heavily reused strikes found in Tekken 4; the localized damaged system in which limbs can be permanently damaged found in Tao Feng: Fist of the Lotus; the wall throws, height-zone specific counters, and stage transitions found in Dead or Alive 3; the environmental usage found in Mortal Kombat: Deception; and the overall realism (Such as a lack of juggling), heavy, high-recovery move kinaesthetics, and gritty, grimy, urban aesthetic found in titles such as Def Jam: Fight for NY. In a side-view, players control one of two characters who perform various fighting moves until one is beaten. Fight Club structures the formula around the premise of the movie, where two men meet secretly to fight each other into submission. In the game, players play as one of the 10+ original characters such as fighters from the novel and movie, including Tyler Durden and Robert (Bob) Paulson.

The game sports the gritty feel of the movie with injuries inflicted on players and blood splattering everywhere, including onto the screen. The game also introduces many new features into the fighting game genre. There is a Hardcore mode, where injuries are carried over from one fight to another, which could lead to the player being so injured that he is forced into retirement (Although this mode only applies to custom-made characters, not the ones from the movie and book). The game also goes into a mode showing X-rays of the character to show bones being broken. The fighting moves are intended to be brutally violent, such as one where the opponent's arm is visibly broken at the elbow. The levels are also designed around scenes from the movie, such as Lou's bar and Paper Street.

There is a story mode, built around an original character—named only protagonist, who decides to join Fight Club after breaking up with his girlfriend. By winning fights, the character moves up through the ranks of Fight Club, getting closer to Project Mayhem and to becoming Tyler Durden's right-hand man. The story diverges from the movie and novel in several ways to accommodate the new character. Winning Story mode also unlocks Fred Durst, lead singer from Limp Bizkit, as a playable character, as per the singer's own stated demands that he becomes a playable character in any videogame licensing and using music from his band.

Cast

Reception

Upon release, Fight Club was met with negative reception. GameRankings and Metacritic gave it a score of 40.11% and 37 out of 100 for the Xbox version, and 36.84% and 36 out of 100 for the PlayStation 2 version.

The game has mostly been dismissed by fans of both the novel and movie as an attempt to milk the success of the story for commercial gain, and was universally panned by critics on its own merits. Critics say the game copies too much from other fighting games without bringing much new to the genre, and has repetitive fighting moves and poor animation. GameSpot gave the Mobile version a score of 4.4 out of ten and stated that the experience "lacks in so many ways that it's hard for it to even hold a candle to its namesake. The game is short, very easy, and the attack system is needlessly diverse. Regardless of your interest in the subject matter, Fight Club is most definitely not your kind of game." IGN gave the same version a score of 6.3 out of 10 and said that it "may only cost about four bucks to play, but I can tell you there are too many better ways to spend four bucks now." However, the same site gave its 3D version a score of 4.1 out of 10 and stated that it "just isn't a very good game. The fighting mechanics are just too shallow, and we've now seen with Brady Bunch Kung Fu and Medieval Combat, that fun brawling is indeed possible on a cellphone. Couple the dull game play with some bugs, and I cannot reasonably recommend Fight Club to anybody, no matter how much of a Space Monkey they are."

The game failed to achieve commercial success. Nevertheless, Abraham Lincoln is ranked fourth in Electronic Gaming Monthlys list of the top ten video game politicians for his appearance in Fight Club for the PlayStation 2. Game Informer placed Fight Club at number ten in a 2011 list of "Top Ten Fighting Games We'd Like to Forget".

References

External links

 
 

2004 video games
20th Century Studios video games
3D fighting games
Fight Club
Mobile games
Multiplayer and single-player video games
PlayStation 2 games
Superscape games
Video games based on adaptations
Video games based on films
Video games based on novels
Video games developed in the United Kingdom
Xbox games